The 2019–20 Vijay Hazare Trophy is the 18th season of the Vijay Hazare Trophy, a List A cricket tournament in India. It is being contested by 38 teams, divided into four groups, with nine teams in Group B. The group stage started on 24 September 2019. The top five teams across Group A and Group B progressed to the quarter-finals of the competition.

Seventeen out of the first thirty matches that were scheduled to be played across all four groups were abandoned or finished in a no result. Therefore, the Board of Control for Cricket in India (BCCI) issued a revised schedule for the rain-affected matches. By 3 October 2019, twenty-two fixtures in Group B had been abandoned due to rain. Wasim Jaffer criticized the pitches for Group-B matches in Vadodara and called them "unfit" for List-A matches.

After the final group matches, Delhi and Punjab had both progressed from Group B to the knockout phase of the tournament.

Points table

Fixtures

Round 1

Round 2

Round 3

Round 4

Round 5

Round 6

Round 7

Round 8

Round 9

Round 10

Round 11

Round 12

Round 13

Round 14

Round 15

Round 16

References

Vijay Hazare Trophy
Vijay Hazare Trophy
Vijay Hazare Trophy